Clark Hodder (November 9, 1903 – June 15, 1968) was an American athlete, coach, and administrator who won the Massachusetts State Amateur Championship and played and coached hockey at Harvard College.

Golf
In 1921, Hodder won the Massachusetts Junior Championship. Later that year he won the South Shore Championship. In 1922, Hodder won 10 open amateur tournaments, repeated as state junior champion, and lost the Massachusetts State Amateur Championship to Francis Ouimet by one stroke.

In 1924, he won the Massachusetts mixed four-ball championship with Glenna Collett. He repeated in 1925, this time with Elizabeth Gordon. He and Lina Baker were runners-up in 1927.

The Massachusetts State Amateur Championship long eluded Hodder and in 1936, his 15th year competing in the tournament, he was described by W. A. Whitcomb of The Boston Globe as being "relegated to the category which claims Mac Smith and other stars who always challenge but never quite can win". That year he was able to win the Championship by one stroke over Leo Martin.

In 1951 and 1953, Hodder and his son, James, won the Massachusetts Golf Association's father-son championship.

Other sports
Hodder was an all-around athlete at Newton High School and Harvard College. He played cover point and centre for the Harvard Crimson men's ice hockey team and was the third consecutive Newton High School graduate (after George Owen and Tad Crosby) to serve as captain of the freshman squad. As a senior, he led the Crimson to an 8-2 record. He was the only player to play the entire 90 minutes in an overtime effort against Yale, which they lost 1-0. A sports columnist wrote that Clark's "exhibition of stamina, endurance and stellar play in this contest was the greatest I have ever seen in forty years of observation." He was also the left fielder on Harvard's baseball team. In 1925, he was the captain of the Harvard golf team. 

The son of a Boston Yacht Club commodore, Hodder also raced a twelve-foot yacht named Una. After graduating, Hodder continued his hockey career with the Boston Athletic Association and the University Hockey Club. He was admitted to the Harvard Varsity Club Hall of Fame for ice hockey in 1997. His granddaughter, Holly Hodder Eger (Harvard Class of 1982) accepted the award on his behalf.

Coaching
In 1930, Hodder was named freshman hockey coach at Harvard. In 1935, he became the school's varsity golf coach.

In 1938 he was promoted to varsity hockey coach. In his first season as varsity coach, the Crimson, led by Austie Harding, had a successful season. The team then slumped for two seasons before making progress in 1941–42. He resigned on January 15, 1942, after several members of his team caused a disturbance during a Christmas trip to Lake Placid, New York. In his four seasons as head coach, Hodder led Harvard to a 20–34–3 record.

Personal life
On March 5, 1931, Hodder married Marjorie Estabrook of Newton, Massachusetts. They had one child together. On August 18, 1934, she was granted a divorce in Reno, Nevada. Hodder married Marian ("Peggy") Dewey Turner in 1938; they divorced in 1960. Hodder is a direct descendant of the famous writer and ship captain James Riley

Administration
In 1952, Hodder was elected president of the Massachusetts Golf Association. As MGA president he had four key objectives: to have the MGA's executive committee become more active with member clubs, to establish a special public links committee, to reduce the amount of open tournaments and increase the amount of invitationals, and to start a campaign to educate golfers on the rules of the sport. He did not run for reelection in 1953 and was succeeded by George O. Russell Jr.

In 1953, Hodder was named manager of the Boston Arena. He was chosen by the arena authority's chairman, Francis Ouimet. He was responsible for creating the Boston Arena Christmas Tournament. In 1957 the Boston Hockey Coaches and Writers Association created the Clark Hodder Award to honor the New England coach of the year. The inaugural recipient was Harvard's Cooney Weiland.

Hodder also worked for his father's patent firm and for the Framingham, Massachusetts post office. He died unexpectedly on June 15, 1968, at his home in Framingham.

References

1906 births
1968 deaths
Amateur golfers
American male golfers
American male sailors (sport)
American sports executives and administrators
Golfers from Massachusetts
Harvard College alumni
Harvard Crimson baseball players
Harvard Crimson men's golfers
Harvard Crimson men's ice hockey coaches
Harvard Crimson men's ice hockey players
Sportspeople from Framingham, Massachusetts
Sportspeople from Newton, Massachusetts